The Shops at Northfield, formerly Northfield Stapleton, is an open-air,  retail town center located at the Stapleton International Airport redevelopment in Denver, Colorado, United States. It is owned and operated by QIC.

Northfield Stapleton is anchored by Macy's, Super Target, JCPenney, Bass Pro Shops Outdoor World, and an 18-screen Harkins Theaters. Northfield also includes approximately 50 specialty shops, restaurants and retailers.

Anchors
Super Target (Opened 2005)
JCPenney (Opened 2005)
Bass Pro Shops Outdoor World (Opened 2005)
Macy's (Opened 2006)
Macy's Home (Opened 2012)

Junior Anchors
Northfield 18 (Opened 2006)
H&M (Opened 2018)

Former Anchors
Borders Books (Opened 2005, Closed 2011) (Replaced by Macy's home department)
Circuit City (Opened 2005, Closed 2009) (Replaced by GameWorks)

Sustainability
Northfield Stapleton was named a Bronze Achiever in the Environmental Leadership Program by Colorado's Department of Public Health and Environment. It was registered as a Leadership in Energy and Environmental Design (LEED) Core and Shell Pilot Project with the United States Green Building Council (USGBC) and recently named the first main street retail center in the U.S. to receive LEED-CS Silver certification.

References

External links
 Northfield Stapleton
 Symphony in Lights Preview

Tourist attractions in Denver
Buildings and structures in Denver
Shopping malls in Colorado
Leadership in Energy and Environmental Design basic silver certified buildings
Shopping malls established in 2005
2005 establishments in Colorado